Redcore is a web browser developed by Chinese company Redcore Times (Beijing) Technology Ltd.. Redcore is based on Chromium and uses the Blink browser engine.

The company previously claimed Redcore used a new browser engine that was developed in-house. In August 2018, social media users revealed that Redcore's internals were substantially similar to those of Google Chrome.

History 

On 15 August 2018, Redcore Times (Beijing) Technology Ltd. announced that it had raised 250 million RMB in its series C funding round from venture capital investors, including Morningside Venture Capital, Fortune Venture Capital, and IDG Capital. At the time of financing, the company marketed Redcore as a "100pc China-developed browser" and claimed that it used the "Redcore" browser engine.

On 16 August 2018, after Redcore was revealed to be based on Chromium, Redcore Times (Beijing) Technology Ltd. responded that the project did not solicit state funds in its previous round of funding.

Chromium plagiarism scandal 
On 16 August 2018, Chinese social media users disclosed that the Redcore installer, when fully decompressed, contained similar files and directories as the installer for Google Chrome. After the disclosure, media outlets including Sina accused Redcore of plagiarism and criticized the company for marketing a "Chrome-shell browser" as a domestic product developed completely in-house.

Chen Benfeng, the CEO of Redcore Times (Beijing) Technology Ltd., defended the product by describing three additional features of Redcore that were not present in Google Chrome.

By the end of 16 August, Redcore was no longer available for download from the company's website. Company co-founder Gao Jing told the China News Service that although the web browser is based on the open-source resources from Chrome, "it still uses domestic core technology and has other innovative elements". Gao said the browser was removed from the company's website to conduct "urgent technology checks".

On 17 August 2018, Redcore Times (Beijing) Technology Ltd. issued an apology announcement disclosing that Redcore is a browser engine based on Chromium.

See also 
 List of hoaxes
 List of web browsers

References 

Cross-platform web browsers
Windows web browsers
Linux web browsers
Freeware
2018 software
2018 in China
Hoaxes in China
Internet hoaxes